The tribe Alberproseniini Martínez & Carcavallo, 1977 belongs to the subfamily Triatominae and only has one genus, Alberprosenia Martínez & Carcavallo, 1977, with two species:

  Alberprosenia goyovargasi Martínez & Carcavallo, 1977 – Zulia, Venezuela
  Alberprosenia malheiroi Serra, Atzingen & Serra, 1980 – Pará, Brazil

References

Reduviidae
Cimicomorpha genera
Hemiptera of South America